Trentepohliales is an order of Ulvophyceaen green algae.

References

External links

Chlorophyta orders
Ulvophyceae